The empat perkataan is a traditional Southeast Asian poetic form originating from the Malaccan Empire in the 15th century. It was popular among inhabitants of the Riau Archipelago and Malay Peninsula. It is primarily associated with Austronesian languages such as Malay, Tagalog, Sundanese and Javanese, but modern examples can also be found in English. The term is derived from the Malay words for 'four' and 'words'. Singaporean poets including Alvin Pang have been reviving the form for its elegance, versatility and association with Language poetry.

Structure

The classic empat perkataan abides by the following rules and has no fixed length.

 All lines consist of exactly four words.
 The four words should not proceed in traditional sentence form but consist of fragments associated by either meaning or sound.
 The lines are rhymed or assonant with a rhyme scheme either conforming to couplets (AABBCCDD), or alternating rhymes (ABABCDCD).
 In its strictest form, all of the words in an empat perkataan should be of two syllables.

At its best, the empat perkataan can create a surprising confluence of associated meaning and mood reminiscent of more post-modern forms.

Variants

The classic version of the form with adherence to all rules is known as the empat perkataan perempuan. Less adherent versions omitting the two-syllable rule are known as empat perkataan sajak, whereas the simplest version not adhering to any rhyme scheme or syllabic constraints is known as the empat perkataan kosong.

See also
Pantoum or Pantun
Syair
Hainteny

References
Empat Perkataan Poetry, article by John Reinhart
Singaporean literature
Singaporean poetry